Meriota the Dancer (German: Meriota, die Tänzerin) is a 1922 Austrian silent historical film directed by Julius Herska and starring Maria Mindzenty, Nora Gregor and Oscar Beregi Sr.

Cast
 Maria Mindzenty as Meriota 
 Nora Gregor as Lucrezia Borgia
 Oscar Beregi Sr. as Cesare Borgia
 Max Devrient as Pope Alexander VI
 Rudolf Bandler as Narr 
 Victor Kutschera as Antonio Quirini 
 Ferdinand Mayerhofer as Cecco, Wirt 
 Susanne Osten as Teresa Quirini 
 Norbert Schiller as Luigi Quirini 
 Wilhelm Schmidt as Manrone Tosca 
 Armin Seydelmann as Mateo Felice 
 Hans Siebert as Pietro Campo 
 Anna Kallina
 Hanns Kurth

References

Bibliography
 Elisabeth Büttner & Christian Dewald. Das tägliche Brennen: eine Geschichte des österreichischen Films von den Anfängen bis 1945, Volume 1. Residenz, 2002.

External links

1922 films
Austrian silent feature films
Films directed by Julius Herska
Austrian black-and-white films
1920s historical films
Films set in the 16th century
Austrian historical films
Films set in Italy
Cultural depictions of Cesare Borgia
Cultural depictions of Lucrezia Borgia
Cultural depictions of Pope Alexander VI